Allotinus is a genus of butterflies in the family Lycaenidae. The genus was erected by Cajetan Felder and Rudolf Felder in 1865. The members (species) of this genus are found in the Indomalayan realm.

Species
Subgenus Allotinus
Allotinus agnolia Eliot, 1986
Allotinus albifasciatus Eliot, 1980
Allotinus fallax C. Felder & R. Felder, [1865]
Allotinus major C. Felder & R. Felder, [1865]
Allotinus maximus Staudinger, 1888
Allotinus nicholsi Moulton, [1912]
Allotinus otsukai Takanami & Seki, 1990
Allotinus subviolaceus C. Felder & R. Felder, [1865]
Subgenus Fabitaras Eliot, 1986
Allotinus bidiensis Eliot, 1986
Allotinus borneensis Moulton, 1911
Allotinus brooksi Eliot, 1986
Allotinus fabius (Distant & Pryer, 1887)
Allotinus kudaratus Takanami, 1990
Allotinus nigritus (Semper, 1889)
Allotinus portunus (de Nicéville, 1894)
Allotinus punctatus (Semper, 1889)
Allotinus sarrastes Fruhstorfer, 1913
Allotinus strigatus Moulton, 1911
Allotinus taras (Doherty, 1889)
Subgenus Paragerydus Distant, 1884
Allotinus albatus C. Felder & R. Felder, [1865]
Allotinus albicans Okubo, 2007
Allotinus apries Fruhstorfer, 1913
Allotinus corbeti Eliot, 1956
Allotinus davidis Eliot, 1959
Allotinus drumila (Moore, [1866])
Allotinus horsfieldi (Moore, [1858])
Allotinus leogoron Fruhstorfer, 1915
Allotinus luzonensis Eliot, 1967
Allotinus macassarensis (Holland, 1891)
Allotinus melos (H. H. Druce, 1896)
Allotinus nivalis (H. Druce, 1873)
Allotinus paetus (de Nicéville, 1895)
Allotinus parapus Fruhstorfer, 1913
Allotinus samarensis Eliot, 1986
Allotinus substrigosus (Moore, 1884)
Allotinus unicolor C. Felder & R. Felder, [1865]
Subgenus unknown
Allotinus thalebanus Murayama & Kimura, 1990

Former species
Allotinus distanti Staudinger, 1889 = Logania marmorata palawana

References

, 1986. A review of the Miletini (Lepidoptera: Lycaenidae). Bull. Br. Mus. nat. Hist. (Ent.) 53(1): 1-105.
 , 2007: A new species of Allotinus (Paragerydus) (Lepidoptera: Lycaenidae) from the Philippines. Trans. lepid. Soc. Japan 58 (2): 162-164. Abstract and full article: .
, 1990. Miscellaneous notes on Lycaenidae (Lepidoptera) from South-East Asia (I).  Tyô to Ga 41 (2): 67-77. Abstract and full article: .
 , 1990, Notes on Lycaenidae from Borneo and Sumatra, with description of a new species of the genus Allotinus. Futao 5: 1-7.

External links

 With images.
 With images.

 
Lycaenidae genera
Taxa named by Baron Cajetan von Felder
Taxa named by Rudolf Felder